Kupala Night, also called Ivanа Kupala, is a traditional Slavic holiday that was originally celebrated on the shortest night of the year, which is on  or 23-24 of June (Czech Republic, Poland and Slovakia) and in Eastern Slavic countries according to traditional Julian calendar on the night between 6 to 7 July (Belarus, Russia and Ukraine). Calendar-wise, it is opposite to the winter holiday Koliada. The celebration relates to the summer solstice when nights are the shortest and includes a number of Slavic rituals. It involves herb collecting, bonfire lighting, and bathing in the river.

History 
 
The name of the holiday was originally Kupala; a pagan fertility rite later adapted into the Orthodox Christian calendar by connecting it with St. John's Day which is celebrated on 24 June. Eastern Christianity uses traditional Julian calendar which is misaligned with actual solstice; 24 June in Julian calendar falls on 7 July in more modern Gregorian calendar.

This holiday symbolizes the birth of the summer sun – Kupalo. In the 4th century AD, this day was proclaimed the holiday of the birth of John the Baptist – the forerunner of Jesus Christ. As a result of the Christianization of the pagan feast the name "Kupala" got connected with the Christian "Ivan".

The Ukrainian, Belarusian name of this holiday combines "Ivan" (Joan/Johan/John, in this case John the Baptist) and Kupala which was thought to be derived from the Slavic word for bathing, which is cognate. However, it likely stems from the proto-Slavic kump, a gathering. The two feasts could be connected by reinterpreting John's baptizing people through full immersion in water. However, the tradition of Kupala predates Christianity. The pagan celebration was adapted and reestablished as one of the native Christian traditions intertwined with local folklore.

Folklore and Slavic religious beliefs

Many of the rites related to this holiday are connected with the role of water in fertility and ritual purification. This is due to the ancient Kupala rites.
On Kupala day, young people jump over the flames of bonfires in a ritual test of bravery and faith. The failure of a couple in love to complete the jump, while holding hands, is a sign of their destined separation.

Girls may float wreaths of flowers (often lit with candles) on rivers, and attempt to gain foresight into their romantic relationship fortune from the flow patterns of the flowers on the river. Men may attempt to capture the wreaths, in the hope of capturing the interest of the woman who floated it.

There is an ancient Kupala belief that the eve of Ivan Kupala is the only time of the year when ferns bloom. Prosperity, luck, discernment, and power befall whoever finds a fern flower. Therefore, on that night, village folk roam through the forests in search of magical herbs, and especially, the elusive fern flower.

Traditionally, unmarried women, signified by the garlands in their hair, are the first to enter the forest. They are followed by young men. Therefore, the quest to find herbs and the fern flower may lead to the blooming of relationships between pairs within the forest.

Ferns are not angiosperms (flowering plants), and instead reproduce by spores; they cannot flower.

In Gogol's story The Eve of Ivan Kupala (also called Saint John's Eve), a young man finds the fantastical fern-flower, but is cursed by it. Gogol's tale was adapted by Yuri Ilyenko into a film of the same name, and may have been the stimulus for Modest Mussorgsky to compose his tone poem Night on Bald Mountain.

See also
 Midsummer
 Wianki (Poland)
 Kupala
 Kupalinka (Kupala Night Maiden), popular Belarusian song
 Kupolė 
 Jāņi
 Semik — a related spring holiday.
 Janka Kupała — the pen-name of this Belarusian author refers to his birthday of July 7.
 Loi Krathong — Thai autumn festival when people leave wreaths with candles on rivers
 Chaharshanbe Suri — Iranian festival celebrated on the eve of the last Wednesday of the year

References

External links

 Купалле
 Ukrainian Kupala (alt. Kupalo, Kupailo) traditions
 The Day of Ivan Kupala as it has survived in the Vologda Region
Kupalle holiday in Belarus (video)  on the Official Website of the Republic of Belarus 
 Kupala Night in Poland

Observances in Russia
Russian folklore
Saint John's Day
Observances in Poland
Folk calendar of the East Slavs
Belarusian traditions
Russian traditions
Ukrainian traditions
Observances in Ukraine
Slavic holidays
Days celebrating love
Summer events in Ukraine
Summer events in Poland

lt:Rasos
mk:Тајане
sr:Ивањдан